The Treaty of Abernethy was signed at the Scottish village of Abernethy in 1072 by king Malcolm III of Scotland and  William of Normandy.

William had started his conquest of England when he and his army landed in Sussex, defeating and killing the English king Harold,  at the Battle of Hastings, in 1066.

William's army had to suppress many rebellions to secure the kingdom. As a result of the unrest, some English nobles had sought sanctuary, in Scotland, at the court of  Malcolm III. One of these was Edgar Ætheling, a member of the house of Wessex and thus the last English claimant to the throne of England.

Faced with a hostile Scotland, in alliance with disaffected English lords including  Ætheling,  William rode north and signed with Malcolm the Treaty of Abernethy. Although the specific details of the treaty are lost in history, it is known that in return for  swearing allegiance to William, Malcolm was  given estates in Cumbria and Edgar Ætheling was banned from the Scottish court.

Background
In 1040, Duncan I of Scotland had been killed in battle by Macbeth. Duncan's son Malcolm was forced to seek safety in England. Fifteen years later Malcolm was able to avenge the death of his father at the Battle of Lumphanan, where Macbeth was  killed. Lulach, Macbeth's step-son, succeeded to the throne of Scotland briefly before he too died at Malcolm's hands in 1058. With the death of Lulach, Malcolm became King of Scots. During the course of his reign Malcolm invaded the northern counties of England numerous times. The counties of Northumberland, Cumberland and Westmorland were historically claimed by Scotland.

In England after the defeat  and death of Harold Godwinson at the Battle of Hastings in 1066, English resistance to their Norman conquerors  was centred on Edgar Ætheling, the grandson of Edmund Ironside. Ironside was half-brother to Edward the Confessor. Copsi, a supporter of Tostig (a previous Anglo-Saxon earl of Northumbria who had been banished by Edward the Confessor), was a native of Northumbria and his family had a history of being rulers of Bernicia, and at times Northumbria. Copsi had fought in Harald Hardrada's army with Tostig, against Harold Godwinson at the Battle of Stamford Bridge in 1066. He had managed to escape after Harald's defeat. When Copsi offered homage to William at Barking in 1067, William rewarded him by making him earl of Northumbria. After just five weeks as earl, Copsi was murdered by Osulf, son of Earl Eadulf III of Bernicia. When, in turn, the usurping Osulf was also killed, his cousin, Cospatrick, bought the earldom from William. He was not long in power before he joined Edgar Ætheling in rebellion against William in 1068.

With two earls murdered and one changing sides, William decided to intervene personally in Northumbria. He marched north and arrived in York during the summer of 1068. The opposition melted away, with some of them – including Edgar – taking refuge at the court of Malcolm III. In the winter of 1069-70 William led his army on a campaign of terror in the English north country in an action known as the Harrowing of the North.

In 1071 Scotland, Malcolm married the Ætheling's sister, Margaret. The marriage of Malcolm to Edgar's sister profoundly affected the history of both England and Scotland. The influence of Margaret and her sons brought about the Anglicisation of the Lowlands.

Edgar sought Malcolm's assistance in his struggle against William.  Then with Edgar as an ally, Malcolm was able to use the  opportunity to try and expand his kingdom to include the northern disputed counties of England. In 1071 he invaded Cumberland, possibly to establish the border between Carlisle and Newcastle. He harried the farms and villages, carrying off so many people that according to one chronicler, there was no village or even large house in southern Scotland that did not afterwards have an English servant or two.

The treaty
Malcolm's raiding of northern England and the formal link between the royal house of Scotland and the Anglo-Saxon house of Wessex was an obvious threat to William. With his campaign in the north country over, he turned his attention to Scotland. In 1072 he brought an army, into southern Scotland. William crossed the Forth and arrived near Abernethy William and Malcolm  signed the  Treaty of Abernethy  through which, according to the Anglo Saxon Chronicle, Malcolm became William's "liege man". The full details of the treaty are not known as no documents have survived, but it seems that Malcolm's son Duncan was given as hostage and Edgar was expelled from the Scottish court. In return for swearing allegiance to William, Malcolm was given estates in Cumbria.

Aftermath and legacy

The peace secured by the treaty was an uneasy one. When negotiations over the disputed Cumbrian territories broke down with the new King of England, William Rufus, Malcolm invaded northern England again and besieged Alnwick Castle. Unexpectedly a relief column arrived, that was led by  the Earl of Northumbria. Malcolm and his son were killed at the ensuing Battle of Alnwick (1093).

In 1173 William the Lion of Scotland supported a rebellion against Henry II of England. In 1174, William was captured at the Battle of Alnwick (1174). He was transferred to  Falaise in Normandy.  There William signed the Treaty of Falaise effectively surrendering Scotland to Henry. Henry then handed Scotland back to William as a fief, in return for William's homage to Henry.
However, after Henry II's death, William  petitioned Richard I of England to be released from the terms imposed on Scotland by the treaty. Richard, needing to raise finance for the Third Crusade accepted William's offer of 10,000
marks, and at Canterbury on 5 December 1189 released him from all allegiance and subjection for the kingdom of Scotland, which remained an independent realm until Edward I's successful revival of English claims of overlordship in 1291-2.

Citations

References

 
 
 
 

 
 

 

11th-century treaties
History of Perth and Kinross
11th century in Scotland
1072 in Europe